Edmonton was the terminal station for passenger services along the Canadian Pacific Railway's subdivision from Calgary to Edmonton shortly after the completion of the High Level Bridge, with services commencing on September 2, 1913. Passenger services across the North Saskatchewan River were discontinued in 1972, and the station building itself was demolished in 1978.

The CPR's arrival in Edmonton
The initial construction of the Calgary and Edmonton Railway in 1891 was limited by the North Saskatchewan River with services reaching no further than Strathcona. This contributed to a competitive disadvantage when the Canadian Northern Railway arrived in Edmonton in 1905. The High-Level Bridge was constructed to complete the railway to Edmonton proper and squash this disadvantage. When it was completed in 1913, CPR (who had acquired the C&E) constructed a new station north of the river, on the northwest corner of Jasper Avenue and 109 Street. The two-story, classical station contained the usual amenities such as a ticketing office and waiting room, as well a special immigrants' waiting room in the basement. The station became a hub for passenger traffic and counterpoint to the CNoR (later Canadian National Railway) station located at 104 Avenue and 100 Street.

Demise
Following the CPR's withdrawal of passenger services to downtown Edmonton in 1972, the station building was demolished in 1978, despite an effort to save it.

References 

Disused railway stations in Canada
Railway stations in Canada opened in 1913
Railway stations closed in 1972
1913 establishments in Alberta